"One Wish" is a 1994 Christmas song by American R&B singer Freddie Jackson, from his album At Christmas.

Whitney Houston version

American R&B singer Whitney Houston covered the song for her 2003 Christmas album, One Wish: The Holiday Album. Her cover, titled "One Wish (for Christmas)", was the only single released from the album and reached number 20 on the US Billboard Adult Contemporary chart.

Promotion
A lyric video for "One Wish (for Christmas)" was released on December 11, 2020.

Personnel 
Credits adapted from Spotify metadata.

Performers and musicians

 Julien Barber – viola
 Sandra Billingslea – violin
 Joseph Bongiorno – double bass
 Alfred Brown – viola
 Bernard Davis – drums
 John Dexter – viola
 Max Ellen – violin
 Sharlotte Gibson – backing vocalist
 Phil Hamilton – guitar
 Ashley Horne – violin
 Regis Iandiorio – violin
 Bashiri Johnson – percussion
 Olivia Koppell – viola
 Gail Kruvand – double bass
 Leonid Levin – violin
 Jesse Levy – cello
 Margaret Magill – violin
 Kermit Moore – cello
 Eugene Moye – cello
 Belinda Carol Pool – violin
 Maxine Roach – viola
 Andy Stein – violin
 Marti Sweet – violin
 Shelene Thomas – backing vocalist
 Harry Zaratzian – viola

Technical

 Ray Bardani – mixing engineer
 Gordon Chambers – arranger, producer, writer
 Barry J. Eastmond – arranger, conductor, producer, writer
  Phil Magnotti – recording engineer
 Anthony Ruotolo – recording assistance
 Matt Snedecor – mixing assistance
 Freddie Jackson –  writer

Charts

References

1994 songs
2003 singles
American Christmas songs
Whitney Houston songs
Songs written by Gordon Chambers
Songs written by Barry Eastmond
Songs written by Freddie Jackson
Freddie Jackson songs